Members of the first Constituent Assembly were elected on 23 and 28 May 1993.

Composition

List of members 
 FUNCINPEC
 Cambodian People's Party
 Buddhist Liberal Democratic Party
 MOULINAKA

Source: National Assembly of Cambodia (in Khmer)

Lists of political office-holders in Cambodia